Julian Arahanga (born 18 December 1972) is a New Zealand film and television actor.

Biography
Arahanga was born Julian Sonny Arahanga in Raetihi, Manawatū-Whanganui, New Zealand. Married to director Becs Arahanga https://www.imdb.com/name/nm8899761/. They have 5 children, Ayesha, Kenzie, Ruby, Mai Te Rangi and Tukaiora. 
His father is screenwriter Larry Parr. Arahanga is 5 foot and 10 inches. His mother is a New Zealander of Estonian and Māori descent.

Of Māori descent, his family identifies with Ngāti Rangi and Atihaunui a Paparangi and is the half brother of Kiwi actor, Tammy Davis.

Arahanga is best known for his role in the movie Once Were Warriors from 1994, where he plays Nig Heke, Arahanga reprises his role in a sequel released in 1999.

He won a starring role in the Gregor Nicholas film  Broken English, Released in 1996.

Later also in 1999, he starred in the action-sci fi movie The Matrix playing the role of Apoc.

Filmography
The Ferryman (2007) – Zane
Eagle vs. Shark (2007) – Flight Extra
Toy Boy (2004) – Angelo
Fracture (2004) – Detective Harawira
Forbidden Fury (2004)
The Lost World (1999) (TV series) – Pintario
The Matrix (1999) – Apoc
What Becomes of the Broken Hearted? (1999) – Nig Heke
Broken English (1996) – Eddie
Hercules: The Legendary Journeys (1995–1996) (TV series) – Cassius (2 episodes)
Once Were Warriors (1994) – Nig Heke
''The Makutu on Mrs Jones (1983) – Tawhai

External links
 
 Singing From the Inside Out – The Personal, the Public, The Private and The Penal: The Innovation Interview with Julian Arahanga, Ruia Aperahama and Evan Rhys Davies, July 2012

Living people
1972 births
New Zealand male film actors
New Zealand people of Māori descent
New Zealand people of Estonian descent
People from Raetihi
New Zealand male Māori actors
20th-century New Zealand male actors
21st-century New Zealand male actors
New Zealand male television actors
Ngāti Raukawa people
Te Āti Haunui-a-Pāpārangi people